Qian may refer to:

Guizhou, abbreviated as Qián (黔), province of China
Mace (unit), or Qian, one of the Chinese units of measurement, equal to 5g
Qian (hexagram), the first hexagram of the I Ching 
Qian (surname), a Chinese surname (钱 / 錢)
Qiān (surname), a Chinese surname (千)
Qian County, in Xianyang, Shaanxi, China
Qian Mountains, mountain range in Northeast China